Telluride Ski Resort is a ski resort located in Mountain Village, Colorado.

The Telluride Ski Resort is located in the southwest corner of Colorado. The resort is in the northwestern San Juan Mountains, part of the Rocky Mountains, and is home to the highest concentration of 13,000 and 14,000 foot peaks in North America. Telluride Ski Resort has over 2,000 skiable acres and spans between the historic town of Telluride, Colorado and the modern alpine community of Mountain Village, Colorado.

While Telluride is known for its advanced terrain the resort has over 50% beginner and intermediate runs. The resort has been ranked #1 in the annual Conde Nast Traveler's Reader's Choice Survey in 2013, 2014 and 2015.

History

Birth of a ski area
Joe Zoline, a businessman, bought two ranches - Adam's Ranch and Gorrono Ranch located on the mountain, sight unseen, in 1968.

Zoline hired Emile Allais, a French Olympic skier to help configure runs and lifts and consult on the design and layout of the mountain. He enlisted the help of Bill "Senior" Mahoney and Ed Bowers to cut trails, clear slopes, and obtain land-use rights, mining claims, and water rights for the ski company. Zoline hired ecologists and environmental planners and encouraged local preservationists to protect the Victorian-era town. The Ski Area started in 1970–71. Five lifts were constructed, and the Telluride Ski School was founded in conjunction with the mountain's opening. The Telluride Ski resort officially opened on December 22, 1972.

At that time there was no access from town and skiers took a bus to the day lodge located on the western side of the mountain. It was not until 1975 when Coonskin Lift 7 was built that the town and ski area were actually connected.

Allred and Wells Ownership Era
Two Colorado Natives, Ron Allred and Jim Wells of the Benchmark Corporation in Avon, Colorado, purchased the ski area from Joe Zoline in 1978. That year, Annie Savath was named Director of The Telluride Ski School, the first female in the country to hold such a position. Through the years, Allred and Wells transformed Telluride through mountain and lift upgrades, construction of on-mountain restaurants and trails, the development of Mountain Village, creation of innovative public transportation systems (the Gondola and Chondola) and the development of Prospect Bowl.

The 1981-82 ski season saw Telluride's first snowmaking system which included two miles of welded steel pipe buried three feet underground. The winter before, Colorado experienced one of the driest snow seasons on record. 1981 also was the inaugural year of Telluride Women's Week. It is currently the longest running women's focused program in the country.

Growth in the region between 1984 and 1986 included the opening of the Telluride Regional Airport (TEX), the start of construction on the Mountain Village, and continued on mountain improvements such as two triple chairs: the Plunge Lift 9, Village Express Lift 4, a surface lift for the race hill, as well as the purchase of snowcats and more snowmaking equipment. Although unofficially skied since the early days, ski run "The Plunge" was officially created along with "Kant-Mak-M" and "Mammoth", on the front face. "Pick-N-Gad" and "O'Reilly's" were also cut.

Mountain Village, Colorado was founded in 1987 and incorporated in 1995 as a home rule municipality. The addition of an 18-hole golf course in mountain village in 1992 transformed the Telluride Ski Area into the Telluride Ski & Golf Company, creating a year-round tourist destination offering activities catering to a wide range of guest interests. Subsequently, in 1994, the resort built new corporate offices, various facilities for mountain operations, golf and skiers services, and Big Billie's, a restaurant and 150-unit employee housing complex at the base of the Chondola Lift 1. The free pedestrian Gondola, spanning between the historic town of Telluride and Mountain Village opened on December 20, 1996.

In July 1999, Allred and Wells acquired a joint-venture partner, Hideo "Joe" Morita of Morita Investments International (MINT) who was an avid skier and part owner of Arai Ski Resort in Japan. This year also brought the upgrade of three new lifts, two high speed detachable quads and one fixed grip triple. The Telluride Conference Center also had its grand opening. Presently the Telluride Conference Center is under the management of Telluride Ski and Golf and is host to multiple events and live music in addition to conferences throughout the year.

Allred's, the resort's flagship restaurant, opened its doors in 2000.

Morita Ownership Era
By March, 2001, Morita had acquired 100 percent of the Telluride Ski and Golf Company (TSG). The resort added 733-acres of beginner, intermediate, and expert terrain with the opening of Prospect Bowl between 2000 and 2002. The additional terrain nearly doubled the size of the resort and added runs for every ability level including advanced, intermediate, and beginner all from the same chair.

2004 to present
In February 2004, the resort transferred hands to Chuck Horning, a real estate investor from Newport Beach, California, who remains the current owner today. 
The 2004/2005 winter saw the opening of Mountain Quail and with it a guided skiing and snowboarding program.

The high altitude private home, Tempter House, was purchased by the resort in 2006. One of the highest elevation homes in North America, this structure originally built on an old mining claim sits at 12,200 overlooking the Bear Creek Preserve. Tempter House is currently a rental.

Winter 2007-2008 brought more expansion for the resort with the opening of Black Iron Bowl. Eight new runs and 1100 feet of vertical opened for public access adjacent to the Prospect bowl. The area, including the previously guided-only Mountain Quail, spans from West Lake around to Review and Nice Chute. Palmyra Peak and the Gold Hill Chutes 1 & 6-10 opened to the public for the first time in January 2008.

The following winter Telluride Ski and Golf continued their terrain expansion with the opening of Revelation Bowl, located on a northeastern aspect that naturally gathers huge amounts of snow and directly off the back side of the Gold Hill.

In winter 2009, Telluride Ski Resort announced Gold Hill Chutes 2-5 would open for full public access to Gold Hill Chutes 1-10. The highest elevation restaurant in North America, Alpino Vino, also opened this season. This European style eatery sits on See Forever run at 11,966 feet and is modeled after the restaurants found throughout the Dolomites of Italy.

In the spring of 2013, Telluride Ski & Golf purchased the luxury boutique hotel The Inn at Lost Creek.

In July 2015, Telluride Ski and Golf purchased all of the retail space within the Peaks Resort and Spa and assumed the management of hotel operations and the HOA. The 73,000+ square feet of commercial space within the building will include the spa and fitness center, meeting space, restaurants, commercial kitchens and banquet facilities. The Peaks Resort and Spa is a ski-in/ski-out, full-service hotel located adjacent to the Telluride Ski & Golf Club. The hotel features 177 guest rooms, a 42,000 square foot spa with 32 treatment rooms, indoor and outdoor swimming pools and 9,100 square feet of indoor and outdoor meeting space.

Terrain features
The mountain itself covers the face facing the town of Telluride as well as goes over onto the other side (Revelation Bowl). Telluride has a total of 120 runs and 2,000+ acres (810+ hectares) of skiable terrain. 23% of Telluride's runs are ranked at Beginner, 36% Intermediate and 41% Advanced / Expert. Telluride on average receives over 300 inches (789 cm) of snow each winter season.

Slope aspects
North: 50%
South: 7%
West: 33%
East: 10%

Telluride Ski has greatly increased its skiing area in recent years. These have been:

Prospect Bowl (2002)
Prospect Bowl almost doubled the amount of skiable terrain and opened in 2002.

Black Iron Bowl (2007)
For the '07 - '08 ski season, the resort opened the Black Iron Bowl.

Revelation Bowl (2008)
The Telluride ski resort in the summer of 2008 installed a fixed grip quad so skiers could enjoy the other side of the mountain without risk from the hazardous cliffs (also on this side of the mountain).

Lifts

Free Gondola
Telluride's Gondola system provides free transportation between the town of Mountain Village and the town of Telluride. It's the first and only free public transportation of its kind in the United States.

From the town of Telluride at 8,750 feet, the gondola climbs 1,790 vertical feet before reaching Station St. Sophia at 10,540 feet.

What was once an eight-mile drive between the two towns, the Gondola provides a more direct 3-mile route over the mountains. Over 2.5 million people ride the Gondola each year. The Gondola has also adopted the state of Colorado's Climate Action Plan to further reduce greenhouse gas emissions by 20 percent by the year 2020. The plan, called the Green Gondola Project, has a goal to replace 20 percent of its traditional electricity use with locally generated alternative energy.  These local alternatives include solar panels installed on gondola stations, and the purchase of solar panels through the SMPA Community Solar Array.

Photographs

See also
Telluride, Colorado
Mountain Village, Colorado

References

External links
Telluride Ski Resort website
ColoradoSkiHistory.com - Telluride Ski Area
Telluride Tourism Board Official Site
3dSkiMap of Telluride Ski Resort

Ski areas and resorts in Colorado
Buildings and structures in San Miguel County, Colorado
San Juan Mountains (Colorado)
Uncompahgre National Forest
Tourist attractions in San Miguel County, Colorado